The Pac-12 Conference first sponsored football in 1916. This is an era-list of its annual standings from 1959 to present.

Standings

Athletic Association of Western Universities (AAWU) era (1959–1967)

Pacific-8 Conference era (1968–1977)

Pacific-10 Conference era (1978–2010)

Pac-12 era (2011–2023)

Pac-10 era (2024-present)

References

Pac-12 Conference
Standings